A hardware browser is a tool for displaying related resources under the server or network hardware devices, and allows users to interact with the hardware. It is used to sense, detect, display and control hardware devices in the network. These hardware devices can be networked and upload information via the thing of Internet to exchange information, users can quickly and easily browse a variety of the hardware devices, and configure the hardware devices.

Brief introduction
Hardware browser can display information of hardware under server, network or hardware management system, and is a tool of allowing users to interact with the hardware. Hardware browser interacts with the server and gets information primarily through HTTP protocol. The information is usually given by the server. Users access through a computer web browser (usually with HTML, PHP, etc.). A hardware browser interface may include a plurality of hardware devices; the information of each device is retrieved from the server, network or information hardware. Hardware Browser can be extended to support a large number of plug-ins, including software and associated hardware, such as ARDUINO, MICROARDUINO, STM32, MSP430, Nuvoton MCU. In addition, many hardware browsers also support embedded images, video, audio and other streaming media. Now common hardware browsers include WRTnode hardware management browser and so on.

History
The first hardware browser was proposed by Yong Huang(China), who with WRTnode machinery group in 2014 co-invented the first hardware browser. Since then, the hardware browser develops with the Internet and Internet of Things together. At the same time, Maker Faire 2014 in Shenzhenthe show the lowest cost and power consuming computer vision automation solution, WRTnode gives uARM eyes and brain, using OpenCV ported on OpenWrt, recognizing the coins, and control uARM to pick them up with one yuan goes one side, and fifty cents goes another side.

The first hardware browser
This is invented by WRTnode machine group. Its goal is to optimize the access of the computer and external hardware and released in 2014. Yong Huang, Wei Luo, Jialei Hao, Ke Wang successful make hardware browser, which greatly decreases the initial time costs and programming costs of the user or developer contacting with hardware, especially in the cost of development with the graphical programming, more close to human way of programming; while also allowing more people who play with the hardware easier access to the network or software. As well information systems optimizing the display, interactive information on hardware and network servers is more smooth and natural to users or development. It makes a solid foundation of Internet of Things.

See also
Device Manager

References